Sojern provides a digital marketing platform for the travel industry that utilizes programmatic buying and machine learning technology. Sojern partners with travel companies including airlines, OTAs, hotels, and rental car companies to collect anonymized (non-personally identifiable) traveler data based on consumers' online travel search and booking behavior.

The company is headquartered in San Francisco and has teams based in Dubai, Dublin, London, Omaha, Paris and Singapore.

History

Originally based in Omaha, Nebraska, Sojern was founded in 2007 by Gordon Whitten. In April 2011, former Yahoo! employee Mark Rabe succeeded Whitten as CEO.

Sojern began in the boarding pass advertising space; it was the first company in the U.S. with exclusive patents for Printed and Online Boarding Pass customization technology. In 2008, the company’s airline partners, including Delta Air Lines and Continental Airlines, began utilizing Sojern’s technology to offer targeted ads on boarding passes. Sojern released a new media platform, the Sojern Traveler Platform (STP), in 2011 that focused on improving its technology's targeting capabilities.

Sojern expanded with a 3,811% fiscal year revenue growth between 2008 and 2012. They made Deloitte Fast 500 List five years in a row (from 2013-2017). The company has also expanded internationally, establishing a London office in 2013 and offices in Dubai and Singapore in 2015. The company made its first acquisition in November 2017 when it purchased Facebook and Instagram marketing partner Adphorus, an Istanbul-based advertising tech startup, for an undisclosed amount.

Product and data collection

The Sojern Traveler Platform collects data on travelers' online search and booking behavior (travel intent data) and uses this information to place targeted ads in front of travelers while they are shopping for travel. Specifically, the company supports travel marketers with advertising across display advertising, native, mobile, video, search engine marketing (SEM), metasearch, connected TV (CTV), Facebook and Instagram, prospecting, and retargeting. Sojern uses its traveler intent data in addition to targeting algorithms and programmatic bidding to reach travelers with personalized marketing offers. 

In 2016, Sojern became the first company in travel to be named a DoubleClick Certified Marketing Partner, giving them access to the full suite of DoubleClick Marketing products, including YouTube.

Privacy

Sojern collects and uses anonymous, non-personally identifiable information. In order to identify what information and offers a site visitor might be interested in, anonymous cookies record which pages a site visitor has browsed or which products were purchased on partners’ websites.

Travel trends
In addition to using data to advertise to travelers, Sojern also provides reports and insights on global travel trends. Their travel trends reports have been cited by several sites including HuffPost, USA Today, and Fortune.

Sojern has also released joint research on travel and consumer trends with Think with Google.

Funding

With more than $40 million raised, Sojern ranked #14 on travel news website Skift’s “Top 31 Most Heavily Venture-Funded Startups in Travel.” Sojern received $16 million in Series A round funding in 2008, $10 million and then $7.5 million in Series B in 2013, and secured a Series C funding round of $10 million in 2014. The company’s investors include Industry Ventures, Focus Ventures, Norwest Venture Partners, Trident Capital, and Triangle Peak Partners.

In 2016, Sojern announced they hit the $100 million-annual revenue run rate threshold.

References

Digital marketing companies of the United States
Big data companies
Companies based in San Francisco